Calliostoma nudiusculum is a species of sea snail, a marine gastropod mollusk in the family Calliostomatidae.

Description
The height of the shell attains 15 mm.

Distribution
This species occurs in the Atlantic Ocean off Argentina at depths between 60 m and 100 m.
The perforated, bicarinate, pearly shell has a conical shape. The 4½ whorls are gradate. The first 2 are yellowish, smooth, the following ones denuded-pearly. Beneath the suture the shell is sculptured with a series of nodules and smooth spiral lirae, few in number or evanescent. The body whorl contains elevated concentric lines on the base, stronger on the periphery, and radiating impressed lines. The aperture is rhomboid-rounded. The columellar margin is concave, thickened, below a little expanded, edentulous.

References

External links
 To Biodiversity Heritage Library (1 publication)
 To Encyclopedia of Life
 To World Register of Marine Species

nudiusculum
Gastropods described in 1881